Shinjuku Incident (Shinjuku Inshidento) is a 2009 Hong Kong action thriller film directed by Derek Yee, who also writer with Chun Tin-nam. The film stars Jackie Chan, Naoto Takenaka, Daniel Wu, Xu Jinglei and Fan Bingbing. The film was distributed by Chan's own film company, JCE Movies Limited.

The film was originally to be released on 25 September 2008 but was delayed to the first quarter of 2009. It premiered at the 2009 Hong Kong International Film Festival and released on 2 April 2009.

Plot
 
In the early 1990s, a tractor mechanic nicknamed Steelhead (Jackie Chan) illegally enters Japan from China in search of his fiancée, Xiu-Xiu (Xu Jinglei) with the help of his "brother" Jie (Daniel Wu). Jie has taught Steelhead how to make a living by teaching him the trades of the underworld. One day, while illegally working as part of a clean-up crew in the sewers, Steelhead and his Chinese comrades are spotted by the police and run for their lives. In the ensuing turn of events, Steelhead saves Detective Kitano from drowning, and in gratitude, Kitano decides to stop pursuing Steelhead.

One night, while working in a restaurant with Jie, Steelhead finds Xiu-Xiu with Yakuza leader Eguchi (Masaya Kato). Saddened by seeing his fiancée with another man, he spends the night with Jie drinking and partying with hookers. Once sober, Steelhead decides to become a legal citizen of Japan by any means possible. Steelhead and his Chinese friends begin a money laundering operation, but leave Jie out of it due to his kind-hearted nature. Unfortunately, Taiwanese triad leader Gao (Jack Kao) discovers one of his pachinko machines has been tampered with (fixed by Steelhead's group) and vows to punish the culprit. Jie gets caught playing the tampered pachinko machine and is taken to a dark alleyway where Gao slices Jie's face and cuts off his right hand while trying to get information. Upon learning that Jie is held by the Taiwanese gang, Steelhead and the rest of their group go and collect Jie.

Full of anger, Steelhead sneaks inside Gao's establishment and hides to take revenge, but instead learns of the plot between the Togawa group (rival "allies") and Gao to kill Eguchi. Eguchi, unaware of the plot, arrives at Gao's. Just as Gao is about to kill Eguchi, Steelhead saves him by chopping off Gao's arm with his machete. Steelhead and Eguchi manage to escape and Steelhead is welcomed to the Eguchi estate to recover. There, Steelhead has the chance to catch up with Xiu-Xiu. Steelhead learns that Eguchi and Xiu-Xiu have a little girl, Ayako. Xiu-Xiu tells him that her name is now Yuko and that she is happy with her new life. In gratitude for saving his life, Eguchi returns and offers Steelhead a high-paying job in the Yakuza, which he refuses.

Later, Eguchi tries unsuccessfully to expose Togawa for the attempted assassination, but their boss makes Eguchi apologize for the accusations instead. Eguchi then asks Steelhead to be a hitman. Steelhead agrees under two conditions: he will take control of Gao's territories and legally become a citizen of Japan. Steelhead kills all of his targets, which results in a gang war within the Yakuza ranks. Eguchi is promoted after Togawa and Steelhead become a vassal under Eguchi with Gao's territories.

Steelhead does everything to make a better life for his Chinese brothers, but has no interest in the daily operations of Yakuza activity, leaving the daily operations to his brothers as he starts a successful tractor business. Sometime later, Detective Kitano meets with Steelhead and warns him that all of his brothers have become corrupted. Kitano tells Steelhead that he would be arrested along with his friends, with him charged as the head conspirator. Steelhead makes a deal with Kitano: Steelhead would find evidence to have Eguchi arrested in exchange for his comrades' freedom.

That fateful night, Steelhead and Kitano return to the vassal HQ to warn his comrades about their impending arrest if they do not stop their operation. His brothers violently refuse to give up their rich lives they made with the Yakuza. Eguchi arrives just as Steelhead is stabbed by one of his "brothers". Meanwhile, the Yakuza cannot tolerate Eguchi's leadership anymore. Gao, Nakajima (Eguchi's former subordinate), and Togawa's son agree to take Eguchi down that night.

Waves of Yakuza storm into the building and proceed to kill everyone, with only Eguchi, Steelhead, and Kitano surviving. Gao is also killed with Steelhead's retaliation. Mortally wounded by Nakajima, Eguchi gives Steelhead a flash drive that contains data on the Yakuza operations in the last act of vengeance against the Yakuza for turning on him. As Kitano and Steelhead escape, the police arrive and arrest the Yakuza. After being split up from Kitano, Steelhead meets and bids a sorrowful farewell to a dying Jie, who had also escaped but did not survive the attack at the vassal HQ.

Steelhead calls Yuko to meet in Okubo station, along with Ayako, but Togawa has already taken Ayako hostage and forces Yuko to tell him where Steelhead is headed. Nakajima intercepts Steelhead; the police arrive in time and exchange gunfire with Nakajima and his men. Nakajima shoots Steelhead, but is then gunned down by Kitano. Steelhead, still alive, flees into the sewers. Kitano follows and finds him being swept away by the current and tries to pull him out, but Steelhead tells him it is useless and Kitano does not know how to swim. Steelhead gives the flash drive to Kitano before the current sweeps his body away, calling his debt to Kitano repaid while remembering how happy he was when he was with his comrades in simpler times.

Cast
 Jackie Chan as Steelhead/Nick
 Naoto Takenaka as Inspector Kitano
 Daniel Wu as Jie
 Xu Jinglei as Xiu Xiu/Yuko Eguchi
 Masaya Kato as Toshinari Eguchi
 Tōru Minegishi as Koichi Muranishi
 Jack Kao as Gao Jie (Taiwanese Gang Leader)
 Yasuaki Kurata as Taro Watagawa
 Lam Suet as Old Ghost
 Fan Bingbing as Lily
 Chin Ka-lok as Hongkie (Hong Kong Boy)
 Ken Lo as Little Tai
 Kenya Sawada as Hiro Nakajima
 Paul Chun as Uncle Tak
 Kathy Yuen Ka Yi as Shizuko
 Teddy Lin as Tai Bao (as Teddy Lin Chun)
 Hiro Hayama as Togawa Kyohei (as Hiro Hayama)
 Randy Muscles as Gaijin (uncredited)
 Wong Wai-fai
 Lesley Chiang
 Wu Gang
 Gladys Fung (as Gladys Fung Ho Sze)
 Michael J. Rice
 Ka Leong Chan (as Ringo Chan Ka-leong)
 Baudouin Euloge Adogony 	
 Chu Cho-Kuen
 Takumi Saito

Production
According to director Derek Yee, the film has been in the planning stages for almost 10 years, and was due to start filming in May 2006. Because Chan was busy filming Rush Hour 3, filming for Shinjuku Incident was delayed. Yee didn't mind waiting until Chan's busy schedule had a slot, as the two are good friends and because Yee feels Chan is right for the role. On 26 September 2007, it stated on Chan's website that filming will begin in "a few weeks" in Japan. Filming began in November 2007.

However, due to significant amounts of violence in the film, director Yee made a conscious decision not to release the film in mainland China. China does not have a film classification system, so films are released for all audiences. Yee considered toning down or cutting the violence in order to pass censorship, but felt it would hurt the integrity of the film. Chan, who was an investor in the film, agreed with Yee's decision.

Reception
Russell Edwards of Variety admired the acting in the film, saying, "[The film] defiantly establishes a new dramatic frontier for Chan, who's clearly the star and acquits himself admirably."

Edmund Lee of Time Out Hong Kong wrote "While the film breaks more limbs than it does new ground, Shinjuku Incident is pulsating in its dramatic intensity, and indelible in its brutal vision."

Meanwhile, Brian Miller of The Village Voice wrote "The killing and the brawling between rival Japanese and Chinese gang factions are spasmodic and unruly; there's no glamour to this mobster's rise and fall. Despite its Hong Kong pedigree (Derek Yee directs) Shinjuku Incident forgoes flashy action scenes in favor of old fashioned moralism."

Perry Lam of Muse unhappy with the more inclusive cast, complains that the film is an example of Hong Kong's supposed eroding cinematic identity: "OK, we get the point – mainlanders have always been the patriots, now they can be heroes in Cantonese cinema too… What will become of Hong Kong cinema, or what will be left of it, when its filmmakers stop trying to seek inspiration from the city and make heroes of its people?"

Accolades
16th Hong Kong Film Critics Society Award
 Film of Merit
 Nominated: Best Director (Derek Yee)
 Nominated: Best Screenplay (Derek Yee, Chun Tin-nam)

29th Hong Kong Film Awards
 Nominated: Best Film (Willie Chan, Solon So)
 Nominated: Best Director (Derek Yee)
 Nominated: Best Cinematography (Nobuyasu Kita)
 Nominated: Best Action Choreography (Chin Ka Lok)

Home media
On 22 February 2010, DVD was released by Cine Asia in a 2 disc ultimate edition at the UK in Region 2. In the United States, it was released on home media on 8 June 2010 By Sony Pictures Home Entertainment.

See also

 Jackie Chan filmography

References

External links
 
 
 
 

2009 films
2009 crime drama films
2000s Cantonese-language films
Films directed by Derek Yee
Films set in the 1990s
Films set in Tokyo
Hong Kong crime drama films
2000s Japanese-language films
2000s Mandarin-language films
Triad films
Yakuza films
Films about human trafficking
2000s Japanese films
2000s Hong Kong films
Japan in non-Japanese culture